Akram Hamidi (born 4 January 1999) is a French-Algerian kickboxer and muay thai fighter. He is the current ISKA World K-1 rules flyweight champion and the former WKN European and WBC Muaythai International Bantamweight champion. 

As of January 2023, Beyond Kick ranks him as the seventh best super flyweight (-55 kg) kickboxer in the world.

Kickboxing/Muay thai career

Early career
Hamidi made his step up from the juniors on October 24, 2015, as he was booked to face Valentin Thibault in a B-class match up at King Of Muay Thai. He lost the fight by split decision. After earning his first professional victory eight months later, a first round stoppage of Mehdi Cheloum at La Nuit Des Spartiates V on June 18, 2016, Hamidi was booked to face Mouhssin Chouhik at Nuit Des Guerriers 2 on February 11, 2017. He won the fight by a career-first unanimous decision.

Hamidi was expected to face Steven Mendy at Kings of Muaythai on March 11, 2017. The fight was later cancelled on the day of the weigh-ins, as Mendy weighed-in at 57 kilograms, 1.5 kilograms above the agreed-upon limit. Hamidi faced Bestar Thaqi at Fighters 3 - The Way Of The Champions on June 3, 2017. He won the fight by a third-round knockout.

Hamidi was booked to face Khalil Kacimi for the AFMT Bantamweight (-53.5 kg) title at Hurricane Fighting 4 on June 10, 2017. He won the vacant title by technical knockout, after knocking his opponent down three times in the third round.

After capturing his first professional title, Hamidi went on a four-fight winning streak. He beat Hamza Merdi by unanimous decision at Show Thai 17 on June 30, 2017, Sitpooyaiae Mangkonthep by a first-round knockout at the August 13, 2017, Max Muaythai event, Darren Rolland at Shock Muay 9 on October 14, 2017, and Nong Rose at Kerner Thai on January 6, 2018.

Following his initial success, Hamidi would then go on a cold streak. He first lost a rematch with Darren Rolland by unanimous decision at TEK Fight on March 3, 2018, which was followed by a draw with Rui Botelho at Radikal Fight Night Silver on April 14, 2018 and a decision victory over Emanuele Tetti Menichelli at Hurricane Fighting 5 on June 2, 2018. His bad form was capped of by a first-round knockout loss to Yoshiki Takei at K-1 World GP 2018: inaugural Cruiserweight Championship Tournament on September 24, 2018, which was the first stoppage loss of his career up to that point.

ISKA Flyweight champion
Hamidi faced Samuele Andolina for the WKN European Bantamweight (-53.5 kg) title at Championnat d'Europe WKN K-1 Rules on December 1, 2018. He won the fight by a second-round technical nockout. Hamidi next faced Frederico Cordeiro for the WBC Muaythai International Bantamweight (-53.5 kg) title at Kings Of Muay Thai on October 5, 2019. He won the fight by a unanimous decision. Hamidi faced Sandro Martin for the ISKA World Flyweight (-53.5 kg) K-1 title at Ultimate Muaythai K1 Rules on November 30, 2019, in what was his fourth professional title bout. He won the fight by a second-round knockout. 

He made his first ISKA World K-1 flyweight title defense against Samvel Babayan at Ultimate Muaythai K-1 Rules on November 20, 2021. He retained the title by decision. Hamidi would then go on to win three non-title bouts. He first faced Gonzalo Tebar at Empire Fight on February 8, 2020, whom he beat by unanimous decision. He then beat Abdulvosid Buranov by a first-round knockout at MuayThai Night 6 on June 25, 2021 and Abdel Cherragi by unanimous decision at Empire Fight - Vikings Edition on October 2, 2021.

Hamidi faced Ruben Soane in the main event of Dhee Sok Battle on April 16, 2022. He lost the fight by majority decision.

On September 13, 2022, it was revealed that Hamidi would fight at the Ultimate Muay Thaï K-1 Rules 5 on November 19, against an opponent which would be announced at a latter date. On October 25, it was announced that Hamidi would make his second ISKA flyweight title defense against the K-1 veteran Kazuki Fujita. In front of a crowd of 2,000 spectators, Hamidi retained the title by a fourth-round knockout.

Hamidi faced Giacomo D’Aquino at Boxing Fighters System Event 3 on February 4, 2023. He won the fight by a second-round knockout.

Hamidi faced Mehdi El Jamari at Les Champions du Monde de Kickboxing on June 15, 2023.

Professional boxing career
Hamidi made his boxing debut against Jean Christophe Gomis at Kernfightwerk on October 1, 2022. He won the fight by unanimous decision.

Championships and accomplishments

Professional
Académie Française de Muay Thaï
AFMT Bantamweight (-53.5 kg) Championship 
World Kickboxing Network
WKN European Oriental Rules Bantamweight (-53.5 kg) Championship 
World Boxing Council Muaythai
WBC Muaythai International Bantamweight (-53.5 kg) Championship 
International Sport Karate Association
ISKA World Flyweight (-53.5 kg) K-1 Championship (Two defenses)
Phenix Muay Thai
Phenix Muay Thai K-1 Rules -54kg Championship

Amateur
World Muaythai Federation
 2017 WMF European Junior Championships (-54 kg)
International Federation of Muaythai Associations
 2022 IFMA European Championships (-54 kg)

Fight record

|-  style="background:#;"
|  2023-06-15 ||  || align="left" | Mehdi El Jamari || Marrakech Kickboxing|| Marrakech, Morocco ||  ||  || 
|-

|-  style="background:#cfc;"
|  2023-02-04 || Win || align="left" | Giacomo D’Aquino || Boxing Fighters System Event 3 || Nimes, France || KO (Knee to the body) || 2 || 
|-

|-  style="background:#cfc;"
|  2022-11-19 || Win|| align="left" | Kazuki Fujita || Ultimate Muay Thai K1 5 || Paris, France || KO (Knee to the head) || 4 || 2:05
|-
! style=background:white colspan=9 |

|-
|-  style="background:#cfc;"
|  2022-06-11 || Win || align="left" | Samvel Babayan  || Phenix Muay Thai 13 || Trets, France || Decision || 3 || 3:00
|-
! style=background:white colspan=9 |
|-  style="background:#fbb;"
|  2022-04-16 || Loss || align="left" | Ruben Soane || Dhee Sok Battle || Reims, France || Decision (Majority) || 5 || 3:00

|-  style="background:#cfc;"
|  2021-11-20 || Win || align="left" | Samvel Babayan  || Ultimate Muaythai K-1 Rules || Strasbourg, France || Decision (Unanimous) || 5 || 3:00
|-
! style=background:white colspan=9 |
|-  style="background:#cfc;"
|  2021-10-02 || Win || align="left" | Abdel Cherragi|| Empire Fight - Vikings Edition || Montbéliard, France || Decision (Unanimous) || 3 || 3:00
|-  style="background:#cfc;"
| 2021-06-25|| Win ||align=left| Abdulvosid Buranov || MuayThai Night 6 || Abu Dhabi || KO (Low kicks) || 2 || 0:47
|-  style="background:#cfc;"
| 2020-02-08|| Win ||align=left| Gonzalo Tebar || Empire Fight || Montbéliard, France || Decision (Unanimous) || 3 || 3:00
|-  style="background:#cfc;"
| 2019-11-30|| Win ||align=left| Sandro Martin || Ultimate Muaythai K1 Rules || Strasbourg, France || KO (Right straight) || 2 || 0:57
|-
! style=background:white colspan=9 |
|-  style="background:#cfc;"
| 2019-10-05|| Win ||align=left| Frederico Cordeiro || Kings Of Muay Thai || Luxembourg, Luxembourg || Decision (Unanimous) || 5 || 3:00
|-
! style=background:white colspan=9 |
|-  style="background:#cfc;"
| 2019-05-18|| Win ||align=left| Flavio Scrimali || Muay Thai Show 2 || Kehl, Germany || KO (Right knee) || 2 ||
|-  style="background:#cfc;"
| 2019-02-02|| Win ||align=left| Mike Astarita || Lion Belt 6 || Nancy, France || Decision (Unanimous) || 3 || 3:00
|-  style="background:#cfc;"
| 2018-12-01|| Win ||align=left| Samuele Andolina || Championnat d'Europe WKN K-1 Rules || Strasbourg, France || TKO (Punches and kicks) || 2 || 2:03
|-
! style=background:white colspan=9 |
|-  style="background:#fbb;"
| 2018-09-24|| Loss ||align=left| Yoshiki Takei || K-1 World GP 2018: inaugural Cruiserweight Championship Tournament || Saitama, Japan || TKO (Punches) || 1 || 1:41
|-  style="background:#cfc;"
| 2018-06-02|| Win ||align=left| Emanuele Tetti Menichelli || Hurricane Fighting 5 || Châlons-en-Champagne, France || Decision (Unanimous) || 3 || 3:00
|-  style="background:#c5d2ea;"
| 2018-04-14|| Draw ||align=left| Rui Botelho || Radikal Fight Night Silver || Charleville-Mézières, France || Decision (Unanimous) || 3 || 3:00
|-  style="background:#fbb;"
| 2018-03-03|| Loss ||align=left| Darren Rolland || TEK Fight || Meaux, France || Decision (Unanimous) || 3 || 3:00
|-  style="background:#cfc;"
| 2018-01-06|| Win ||align=left| Nong Rose || Kerner Thai || Paris, France || Decision (Unanimous) || 3 || 3:00
|-  style="background:#cfc;"
| 2017-10-14|| Win ||align=left| Darren Rolland || Shock Muay 9 || Saint-Denis, France || Decision (Unanimous) || 3 || 3:00
|-  style="background:#cfc;"
| 2017-08-13|| Win ||align=left| Sitpooyaiae Mangkonthep || Max Muay Thai|| Pattaya, Thailand || KO || 1 ||
|-  style="background:#cfc;"
| 2017-06-30 || Win ||align=left| Hamza Merdi || Show Thai 17 || Aubervilliers, France || Decision (Unanimous) || 3 || 3:00
|-  style="background:#cfc;"
| 2017-06-10|| Win ||align=left| Khalil Kacimi || Hurricane Fighting 4 || Châlons-en-Champagne, France || TKO (Three knockdowns) || 3 || 
|-
! style=background:white colspan=9 |
|-  style="background:#cfc;"
| 2017-06-03|| Win ||align=left| Bestar Thaqi || Fighters 3 - The Way Of The Champions || Oberkorn, Luxembourg || KO  || 3 ||
|-  style="background:#cfc;"
| 2017-02-11 || Win ||align=left| Mouhssin Chouhik || Nuit Des Guerriers 2 || Pont-à-Mousson, France || Decision (Unanimous) || 3 || 3:00
|-  style="background:#cfc;"
| 2016-06-18 || Win ||align=left| Mehdi Cheloum|| La Nuit Des Spartiates V || Sarreguemines, France || KO (Knee to the body) || 1 || 0:52
|-
|-  style="background:#fbb;"
| 2015-10-24 || Loss ||align=left| Valentin Thibault || King Of Muay Thai ||  Luxembourg || Decision (Split) || 5 || 3:00
|-
| colspan=9 | Legend:    

|-  style="background:#cfc;"
| 2022-02-20|| Win||align=left| Stefanos Sotiriou || IFMA European Championships 2022, Final || İstanbul, Turkey || Decision || 3  ||
|-
! style=background:white colspan=9 |
|-  style="background:#cfc;"
| 2022-02-19|| Win||align=left| Giang Hoang || IFMA European Championships 2022, Semifinal || İstanbul, Turkey || Decision || 3  ||
|-  style="background:#cfc;"
| 2022-02-17|| Win||align=left| Abdulla Magomedov || IFMA European Championships 2022, Quarterfinal || İstanbul, Turkey || Decision || 3  ||
|-  style="background:#fbb;"
| 2019-07-26|| Loss||align=left| Yelaman Sayassatov || IFMA World Championships 2019, Quarter Final || Bangkok, Thailand || Decision (29-28)|| 3 ||
|-  style="background:#cfc;"
| 2019-07-24|| Win||align=left| Vitali Ramanouski || IFMA World Championships 2019, 1/8 Final || Bangkok, Thailand || Decision (29:28)|| 3  ||
|-
|-  style="background:#cfc;"
| 2017-12-04 || Win||align=left| || WMF European Junior Championships 2017, Final || Minsk, Belarus || Decision || 3  ||
|-
! style=background:white colspan=9 |
|-  style="background:#cfc;"
| 2015-07-03 || Win||align=left| Kenzo Fabianelli || Emperor Chok Dee: Young Battle || Vandœuvre-lès-Nancy, France || Decision (30:27) || 3  || 2:00
|-
|-  style="background:#cfc;"
| 2015-10-10 || Win||align=left| Quentin Dupponois || SMMAC 3 || Basel, Switzerland || Decision || 3  || 2:00
|-
|-  style="background:#cfc;"
| 2015-02-01 || Win||align=left| Valentin Thibault || Emperor Chok Dee || Vandœuvre-lès-Nancy, France || Decision || 3  || 2:00
|-
| colspan=9 | Legend:

Professional boxing record

See also
 List of male kickboxers

References 

French kickboxers
Sportspeople from Strasbourg

1999 births
Living people
French Muay Thai practitioners
21st-century French people